"Mountain Jam" is an improvised instrumental jam by The Allman Brothers Band, based on Donovan's 1967 hit song "There Is a Mountain". The first known recording of a performance was done on May 4, 1969, at Macon Central Park. "Mountain Jam" was originally released in 1972 on the album Eat a Peach, as recorded at the Fillmore East concert hall in March 1971 (during the same sessions that produced their prior live double album At Fillmore East). It is this rendition that is best known.

Other live recordings were released on the Allmans albums Fillmore East, February 1970, Live at Ludlow Garage: 1970, Live at the Atlanta International Pop Festival: July 3 & 5, 1970, The Fillmore Concerts, and deluxe edition of At Fillmore East (1971). Notably, Live at the Atlanta International Pop Festival: July 3 & 5, 1970 contains two recordings of the song, the second of which features guest musicians Johnny Winter on slide guitar and Thom Doucette on harmonica.

Origin and influences
There was much interplay in the development of this song between The Allman Brothers Band and another highly influential jam band, the Grateful Dead. According to the book Bill Graham Presents, one night at the Fillmore East when The Allman Brothers were there with the Grateful Dead and Peter Green's Fleetwood Mac, Bill Graham came into an area where Duane Allman, Peter Green, and Jerry Garcia were jamming together on "There Is a Mountain".

Preceding The Allman Brothers Band's official release of the song, the Grateful Dead had briefly referenced "There Is a Mountain," both live and in studio. They can be heard quoting a few bars of it in their song "Alligator" on their 1968 album Anthem of the Sun. An example of the Dead jamming live on the "There Is a Mountain" riff can be heard at the 4:53 mark on the version of "Alligator" they performed at their August 21, 1968, show at the Fillmore West. Conversely, after the Allman Brothers Band release, The Grateful Dead performed a 22:57 version of "Mountain Jam" on July 28, 1973, at the Summer Jam at Watkins Glen. They also played a 55-second version of "Mountain Jam" to transition between "Going Down the Road Feeling Bad" and "Not Fade Away" on November 6, 1970, at Capitol Theater in Port Chester, New York.

Structure
Some 33:41 in length in its March 1971 Eat a Peach performance, the instrumental features solos from all of the band members. Duane Allman starts with a guitar solo, after which Gregg Allman solos on Hammond organ, followed by a guitar solo by Dickey Betts. Midway through the song there is a drum duet by Butch Trucks and Jaimoe, later joined by a bass guitar solo by Berry Oakley. Then the whole band returns with Duane leading them; this produces some of his best-known slide guitar, 23 minutes in.

Besides the titular basis, Jimi Hendrix's "Third Stone from the Sun" is also quoted musically in the piece, roughly 22 minutes in. Also heard near the finish is a section of the hymn, "Will the Circle Be Unbroken".

The recording ends with Duane thanking the audience for coming and introduces his bandmates then himself.

References

1972 songs
The Allman Brothers Band songs
Rock instrumentals
Songs written by Donovan